Mammillaria surculosa is a species of flowering plant in the cactus family Cactaceae, native to north eastern Mexico, where it occurs in extremely isolated patches at altitudes of . It is registered as “Endangered” by the IUCN Red List.

The Latin specific epithet surculosa means “producing suckers”.

In the United Kingdom, where it is best grown under glass due to high precipitation, it has gained the Royal Horticultural Society’s Award of Garden Merit.

References

Flora of Mexico
surculosa